Tropical Storm Arlene was a rare off-season tropical cyclone that hit Cuba and the Bahamas in May 1981. Its formation was unusual, originating from a tropical disturbance that crossed from the eastern Pacific Ocean into the Caribbean Sea; few Atlantic hurricanes develop in this manner. On May 6, a tropical depression developed, and the next day it became Tropical Storm Arlene near the Cayman Islands, three weeks before the start of the hurricane season. This marked the first Atlantic tropical storm in May since 1970's Hurricane Alma. Arlene moved northeastward throughout its life, bringing rainfall and locally gusty winds as it crossed Cuba and the southeastern Bahamas. On May 9, the storm dissipated when a large non-tropical storm absorbed Arlene. There were no reports of deaths or significant damage.

Meteorological history

The origins of Arlene were from a cloud mass that developed in the eastern Pacific Ocean in early May 1981. The system crossed Central America, and by the afternoon of May 5, a low-level circulation was evident near Roatán, off the coast of Honduras. Convection was initially disorganized, preventing classification as a tropical cyclone. It was not until late on May 6 that Dvorak satellite intensity estimates began on the system. Around that time, it is estimated it became a tropical depression, while located near the Cayman Island. It was a rare example of an Atlantic depression forming from a disturbance that originated in the eastern Pacific.

After becoming a tropical depression, the system evolved rapidly as a spiral band formed around the circulation. Based on satellite imagery, the National Hurricane Center upgraded the depression to Tropical Storm Arlene on May 7. By then and through much of its lifetime, the circulation was located along the western edge of the deep convection. Arlene strengthened slightly further to winds of 50 mph (85 km/h), before it moved ashore in eastern Cuba early on May 8. As it approached land, the convection was weakening, although its center maintained a steady northeast path, due to a high pressure system to its north.

While crossing eastern Cuba, the circulation of Arlene became ill-defined, although re-strengthening over water was considered possible. When it reached open waters, Arlene was already a depression, and there was considered little likelihood of redevelopment, with strong shear pushing the convection far east of the center. Nevertheless, a NOAA reconnaissance mission found that winds briefly increased to 60 mph (95 km/h), or tropical storm strength, located over the southeastern Bahamas in a large convective band extending of the center. When the thunderstorms dissipated, the winds again dropped, and Arlene returned to tropical depression status. Early on May 9, the depression was absorbed by an advancing trough. Late the next day, the combined systems reorganized and resembled having some subtropical characteristics, although it weakened further by May 11.

Preparations and impact
As Arlene was approaching its first landfall, the National Hurricane Center noted the potential for heavy rainfall in Jamaica, Cuba, and the Bahamas; small boats in those regions were advised to remain at harbor. Meanwhile, the government of the Bahamas issued storm warnings for the central and southeastern portion of its country. There were no reports of damage or casualties from Cuba or the Bahamas, and therefore storm affects were judged to have been minimal. Arlene was the only May tropical storm on record to affect the Cuban province of Camagüey, although its passage was mostly noticed in its disruption of sugar cane production.

See also

Other storms of the same name

References

External links
National Hurricane Center
Monthly Weather Review for 1981

1981 Atlantic hurricane season
Atlantic tropical storms
Hurricanes in Cuba
Off-season Atlantic tropical cyclones
Arlene